Hosted by Misaki Ito and Hidehiko Ishizuka, the awards show took place at the Saitama Super Arena before a live audience of 12,000 screaming music fans. The 6th annual show premiered live on MTV, Saturday May 26 to over 6.6 million homes in Japan.

Awards
Winners are in bold text.

Video of the Year
Kumi Koda — "Yume No Uta"
 Fergie — "London Bridge"
 Mr. Children — "Shirushi"
 Red Hot Chili Peppers — "Dani California"
 Shōnan no Kaze — "Junrenka"

Album of the Year
Daniel Powter — Daniel Powter
 Ayaka — First Message
 Def Tech — Catch The Wave
 Kumi Koda — Black Cherry
 Red Hot Chili Peppers — Stadium Arcadium

Best Male Video
DJ Ozma — "Age Age Every Night"
 Ken Hirai — "Bye My Melody"
 Kreva — "The Show"
 Daniel Powter — "Bad Day"
 Justin Timberlake — "SexyBack"

Best Female Video
Kumi Koda — "Yume No Uta"
 Ayaka — "Mikazuki"
 Fergie — "London Bridge"
 Reira starring Yuna Ito — "Truth"
 Gwen Stefani — "Wind It Up"

Best Group Video
Exile — "Lovers Again"
 Glay — "100 Man Kai No Kiss"
 My Chemical Romance — "Welcome to the Black Parade"
 Red Hot Chili Peppers — "Dani California"
 Remioromen — "Stand By Me"

Best New Artist
Ne-Yo — "So Sick"
 Angela Aki — "This Love"
 Lily Allen — "Smile"
 Jinn — "Raion"
 The View — "Wasted Little DJs"

Best Rock Video
My Chemical Romance — "Welcome to the Black Parade"
 Asian Kung-Fu Generation — "Aru Machi no Gunjō"
 Ellegarden — "Salamander"
 Fall Out Boy — "This Ain't a Scene, It's an Arms Race"
 Radwimps — "Setsunarensa"

Best Pop Video
Ai Otsuka — "Ren'ai Shashin"
 Christina Aguilera — "Ain't No Other Man"
 Chemistry — "Yakusoku no Basho"
 Rihanna — "SOS"
 Seamo — "Mata Aimashou"

Best R&B Video
AI — "Believe"
 Ciara — "Promise"
 Miliyah Kato — "Kono Mama Zutto Asa Made"
 John Legend — "Save Room"
 Ne-Yo — "So Sick"

Best Hip-Hop Video
Kreva — "The Show"
 Jay-Z — "Show Me What You Got"
 Nas — "Hip Hop is Dead"
 T.I. — "What You Know"
 Teriyaki Boyz featuring Kanye West — "I Still Love H.E.R."

Best Reggae Video
Shōnan no Kaze — "Junrenka"
 Lily Allen — "Smile"
 Matisyahu — "King without a Crown"
 Ryo The Skywalker — "Harewataru Oka"
 Sean Paul — "Temperature"

Best Dance Video
DJ Ozma — "Age Age Every Night"
 Fergie — "London Bridge"
 Gnarls Barkley — "Crazy"
 M-Flo Loves Minmi — "Lotta Love"
 Justin Timberlake — "SexyBack"

Best Video from a Film
Ai Otsuka — "Ren'ai Shashin" (from Heavenly Forest)
 50 Cent — "Window Shopper" (from Get Rich or Die Tryin')
 Beyoncé — "Listen" (from Dreamgirls)
 Bonnie Pink — "Love is Bubble" (from Memories of Matsuko)
 Yui — "Good-bye Days" (from Midnight Sun)

Best Collaboration
U2 and Green Day — "The Saints Are Coming"
 Akon featuring Eminem — "Smack That"
 Sérgio Mendes featuring The Black Eyed Peas — "Mas Que Nada"
 Quruli featuring Rip Slyme — "Juice"
 Ringo Shiina + Saito Neko + Shiina Junpei — "Kono Yo no Kagiri"

Best buzz ASIA

Japan
Yuna Ito — "Precious"
 Bonnie Pink — "A Perfect Sky"
 Dragon Ash — "Ivory"
 DJ Ozma — "Age Age Every Night"
 Rize — "Pink Spider"

South Korea
TVXQ — "O-Jung Ban Hop"
 Brian — "Living a Year in Winter"
 Loveholic — "Chara's Foreset"
 SS501 — "Unlock"
 Super Junior — "U"

Taiwan
Mayday — "Born to Love"
 A-Mei — "I want Happiness?"
 Show Lo — "Jin Wu Men"
 David Tao — "Too Beautiful"
 Faith Yang — "Dutchess"

Special awards

Best Director 
Red Hot Chili Peppers — "Dani California" (directed by Tony Kaye)

Best Special Effects in a Video 
Apogee — "Ghost Song" (Yusuke Tanaka)

Best Stylish Artist in a Video
Kumi Koda

Live performances
Ai Otsuka — "Ren'ai Shashin"
Daniel Powter — "Bad Day"
Kreva — "The Show"
Mika — "Grace Kelly"
My Chemical Romance — "Welcome to the Black Parade"
Ne-Yo — "Because of You"
DJ Ozma — "Age Age Every Night"
Seamo — "Cry Baby"
Shōnan no Kaze — "Junrenka"
TVXQ — "O - Jung.Ban.Hap."
Yuna Ito — "Precious"

Red carpet live
AI
Mika

Guest celebrities

Ami Suzuki
Chemistry
High and Mighty Color
Hiroshi Tanahashi
Juri Ueno
Kanemoto says more
DJ Kaori
Kumi Koda
Leah Dizon
Maki Goto
Mark Hunt
DJ Masterkey
Mayday

Megumi
M-Flo
Misono
Namie Amuro
Shoko Nakagawa
Sowelu
SpongeBob SquarePants
Patrick
Tatsu Chi
W-inds.
Wise
Ya-kyim
Zeebra

2007 in Japanese music